The Sansui Viewers' Choice Movie Awards were a set of awards presented annually by the Pritish Nandy Communications, a company owned by the journalist and politician Pritish Nandy, and aired on Star India. The function was started in 1998.

Winners and nominees

2003 
The winners and nominees have been listed below:

References

External links 
 

Indian film awards
Bollywood film awards
1998 establishments in India